Water, Wall, and Pine Streets Lenticular Truss Bridges is a national historic district and set of Lenticular truss bridges located at Homer in Cortland County, New York.  The district includes a series of three bridges built in 1881 over the Tioughnioga River by the Corrugated Metal Co. of East Berlin, Connecticut.

It was listed on the National Register of Historic Places in 1977.

References

Lenticular truss bridges in the United States
Road bridges on the National Register of Historic Places in New York (state)
Historic districts on the National Register of Historic Places in New York (state)
Bridges completed in 1881
Buildings and structures in Cortland County, New York
Transportation in Cortland County, New York
National Register of Historic Places in Cortland County, New York
Metal bridges in the United States
1881 establishments in New York (state)